Lord Wellington was launched in 1811 at Whitby as a London-based transport. She made one voyage to India c. 1816. She sank in May 1823 after striking an iceberg in the North Atlantic.

Career
Lord Wellington first appeared in Lloyd's Register (LR) in 1811 with "Slighertm", master, Richardson & Co., owners, and trade London Transport.

In 1813 the EIC lost its monopoly on the trade between India and Britain. British ships were then free to sail to India or the Indian Ocean under a license from the EIC.

A list of licensed ships sailing to India showed Lord Wellington, W. Williamson, master, sailing to Batavia and Bengal in August 1816.

Both LR and the Register of Shipping (RS) for 1820 showed Lord Wellington with trade London–Bengal. However, LR gave the name of her master as J. Antice, and RS gave it as Williamson. This appears to be stale data as lists of licensed ships between 1819 and 1823 show no further such voyages for her.

LR for 1823 showed Lord Wellington with J. Gatenby, master, Holt & Co., owners, and trade Liverpool–New Brunswick.

Fate
On 14 May 1823 Lord Wellington, Gatenby, master, was sailing from Liverpool to Miramichi, New Brunswick, when she struck an iceberg on the Newfoundland Banks and stove in her bows. When the water in her hold rose to eight feet her 19 crew members abandoned her and went on board Thompson Packet about a week later. They landed at Picton on 21 May.

Notes, citations, and references
Notes

Citations

References
 
  

1811 ships
Age of Sail merchant ships of England
Ships built in Whitby
Maritime incidents in May 1823